Patiala Assembly constituency (Also known as Patiala Urban) (Sl. No.: 115) is a Punjab Legislative Assembly constituency in Patiala district, Punjab state, India.

Members of the Legislative Assembly 
Source:

Election Results

2022

2017

2012

See also 
 Punjab Legislative Assembly
 List of constituencies of the Punjab Legislative Assembly
 Patiala district
 Punjab Lok Congress
 Capt. Amarinder Singh

References

External links
  

Assembly constituencies of Punjab, India
Patiala district